Fraser Street Halt is a closed railway station in Belfast which was part of the Belfast and County Down Railway system.

The station opened on 01/07/1935 and closed on 16/01/1950. It has been mentioned as early as 1928, in that there would be a stop to serve a train from Donaghadee for the workers at the shipyards and engineering works.

References

Disused railway stations in County Down
Disused railway stations in Belfast
Railway stations opened in 1935
Railway stations closed in 1950
1935 establishments in Northern Ireland
1950 disestablishments in Northern Ireland
Railway stations in Northern Ireland opened in the 20th century